Chañaral Airport ,  is an airport serving Chañaral, a Pacific coastal city in the Atacama Region of Chile.

There is rising terrain north and south of the airport.

See also

Transport in Chile
List of airports in Chile

References

External links
Chañaral Airport at OpenStreetMap
Chañaral Airport at OurAirports

Chañaral Airport at FallingRain

Airports in Atacama Region